The Women's 3000 metres competition at the 2023 World Single Distances Speed Skating Championships was held on 2 March 2023.

Results
The race was started at 18:20.

References

Women's 3000 metres
2023 in women's speed skating